The 2009 Boston Red Sox season was the 109th season in the franchise's Major League Baseball history. The Red Sox finished second in the American League East with a record of 95 wins and 67 losses, eight games behind the New York Yankees, who went on to win the 2009 World Series. The Red Sox qualified for the postseason as the AL wild card, but were swept by the American League West champion Los Angeles Angels of Anaheim in the ALDS.

Roster

Regular season 

The Red Sox opened the season with a postponement due to rain. However, on April 7, the season began at Fenway with the first pitch being thrown by Edward Kennedy, who later died in August. The Red Sox got off to a slow start, going 2–6 in the first eight games. However, the Sox won 11 straight games beginning on April 15. The win streak was Boston's longest since 2006 when they had a 12-game win streak. A highlight of the streak was Jacoby Ellsbury's steal of home on April 26 to cap off a three-game sweep of the New York Yankees. They finished April with a record of 14–8 and tied with the Toronto Blue Jays for the division lead. Also, Jerry Remy, NESN color commentator, had surgery to remove a small area of cancer on his lung. While recovering he also got pneumonia. He also was suffering from fatigue and depression. These are the people who filled in for him: Dennis Eckersley, Dave Roberts, Buck Martinez, Tony Massarotti, Rance Mulliniks, Rex Hudler, Ron Coomer, Ken Rosenthal, Kevin Kennedy, Dwight Evans, Sean Casey, Jim Kaat, Gordon Edes, Bob Montgomery, Frank Viola, Sean McAdam, Brian Daubach, and Rick Dempsey.

The team flattened out in May, going 15–14 in the month and falling to third in the division behind the Yankees and the Blue Jays. Through the first two months of the season, slugger David Ortiz struggled, batting .185 with one home run. Additionally, pitcher Daisuke Matsuzaka was placed on the disabled list after just two starts with an injury that manager Terry Francona attributed to his participation in the 2009 World Baseball Classic. Off the field, announcer Jerry Remy, of NESN television, was replaced by Dennis Eckersley beginning on May 6 as Remy began undergoing cancer treatment. Despite these struggles, the Red Sox set an American League record, tying the Major League record, on May 7 by scoring 12 runs without recording an out during the 6th inning of a game against the Cleveland Indians.

The Red Sox took the division lead, and improved to the second-best record in MLB, during June. Through the first half of the month, the Sox played four division leaders, the Detroit Tigers, Texas Rangers, New York Yankees, and Philadelphia Phillies, winning three of the four series and sweeping both the Tigers and Yankees. By sweeping the Yankees, the Sox improved to 8–0 against the team, the best record against them since sweeping the 14-game season series against them in 1912. At the All-Star break, the Red Sox had the second best record in Major League Baseball and held a three-game lead in the division.

The Red Sox faltered after the All-Star break, losing five of six on the road to the Toronto Blue Jays and Texas Rangers and batting .192 and scoring 13 runs. In response to the poor offensive performance and to make room for Jed Lowrie's return from injury, Julio Lugo was traded to the St. Louis Cardinals for cash and two minor-league players were traded to the Pittsburgh Pirates for Adam LaRoche on July 22, and on July 25 Mark Kotsay was designated for assignment. The Red Sox made a move at the trade deadline, July 31, to acquire catcher Victor Martinez from the Cleveland Indians for pitchers Justin Masterson, Nick Hagadone, and Bryan Price. They also traded Adam LaRoche to the Atlanta Braves for Casey Kotchman. After winning the first eight games of the season against their rival Yankees in the first half of the season, the Red Sox lost nine of the next ten to finish the season 9–9 against them.

One of the stranger victories for the Sox came on August 14 against the Texas Rangers. Going into the top of the 9th inning, the home Rangers were leading 4–2. Jacoby Ellsbury drove in David Ortiz to pull within one run and Jason Varitek was left on second base with no outs. Pitcher, Clay Buchholz came in to pinch run for Varitek with no outs. Dustin Pedroia doubled, but the inexperienced, and potentially tying run, Buchholz, was thrown out at the plate as he hesitated between second and third before attempting to score. All was shortly forgotten when the team scored five more runs to win 8–4. On August 21, Jacoby Ellsbury tied the record for the Red Sox single season record for stolen bases (54), in a game against the New York Yankees, a record previously held by Tommy Harper. Ellsbury then broke the record with his 55th steal on August 25, against the Chicago White Sox.

Opening Day lineup

Season standings

Record vs. opponents

Notable transactions 
 November 19, 2008: Ramón Ramírez was acquired by the Red Sox from the Royals in exchange for Coco Crisp.
 December 28, 2008: Brad Penny signed as a free agent with the Red Sox.
 January 5, 2009: Nick Green signed as a free agent with the Red Sox.
 January 8, 2009: Rocco Baldelli signed as a free agent with the Red Sox.
 January 9, 2009: Mark Kotsay signed as a free agent with the Red Sox.
 January 10, 2009: Takashi Saito signed as a free agent with the Red Sox.
 January 12, 2009: John Smoltz signed as a free agent with the Red Sox.
 July 8, 2009: Jonathan Van Every was released by the Red Sox.
 July 22, 2009: Adam LaRoche was acquired by the Red Sox from the Pirates in exchange for Argenis Díaz and Hunter Strickland. In a separate trade, Chris Duncan was acquired by the Red Sox from the St. Louis Cardinals in exchange for Julio Lugo.
 July 28, 2009: Brian Anderson was acquired by the Red Sox from the Chicago White Sox in exchange for Mark Kotsay.
 July 31, 2009: Casey Kotchman was acquired by the Red Sox from the Braves in exchange for Adam LaRoche. In a separate trade, Víctor Martínez was acquired by the Red Sox from the Indians in exchange for Nick Hagadone, Justin Masterson, and Bryan Price.
 August 5, 2009: Paul Byrd signed as a free agent with the Red Sox.
 August 7, 2009: Chris Woodward was selected off waivers by the Red Sox from the Mariners.
 August 14, 2009: Álex González was acquired by the Red Sox from the Reds in exchange for Kristopher Negrón.
 August 17, 2009: John Smoltz was released by the Red Sox.
 August 21, 2009: Chris Duncan was released by the Red Sox.
 August 25, 2009: Billy Wagner was acquired by the Red Sox from the Mets in exchange players to be named later.
 August 27, 2009: Brad Penny was released by the Red Sox.
 August 29, 2009: Joey Gathright was purchased by the Red Sox from the Orioles.

Detailed record

Game log 

|- bgcolor="ffbbbb"
|- align="center" bgcolor="bbbbbb"
| || April 6 || Rays || colspan=6 |Postponed
|- align="center" bgcolor="bbffbb"
| 1 || April 7 || Rays || 5–3 || Beckett (1–0) || Shields (0–1) || Papelbon (1) || 37,057 || 1–0
|- align="center" bgcolor="ffbbbb"
| 2 || April 8 || Rays || 7–2 || Kazmir (1–0) || Lester (0–1) || Balfour (1) || 37,552 || 1–1
|- align="center" bgcolor="ffbbbb"
| 3 || April 9 || Rays || 4–3 || Garza (1–0) || Matsuzaka (0–1) || Percival (1) || 37,784 || 1–2
|- align="center" bgcolor="ffbbbb"
| 4 || April 10 || @ Angels || 6–3 || Weaver (1–0) || Wakefield (0–1) || Shields (1) || 41,385 || 1–3
|- align="center" bgcolor="bbffbb"
| 5 || April 11 || @ Angels || 5–4 || Penny (1–0) || Saunders (1–1) || Papelbon (2) || 40,163 || 2–3
|- align="center" bgcolor="ffbbbb"
| 6 || April 12 || @ Angels || 5–4 || Moseley (1–0) || Beckett (1–1) || Fuentes (2) || 38,076 || 2–4
|- align="center" bgcolor="ffbbbb"
| 7 || April 13 || @ Athletics || 8–2 || Braden (1–1) || Lester (0–2) || || 21,331 || 2–5
|- align="center" bgcolor="ffbbbb"
| 8 || April 14 || @ Athletics || 6 – 5 (12) || Gallagher (1–0) || López (0–1) || || 22,132 || 2–6
|- align="center" bgcolor="bbffbb"
| 9 || April 15 || @ Athletics || 8–2 || Wakefield (1–1) || Anderson (0–2) || || 35,067 || 3–6
|- align="center" bgcolor="bbffbb"
| 10 || April 17 || Orioles || 10–8 || Ramírez (1–0) || Báez (0–1) || Papelbon (3) || 38,266 || 4–6
|- align="center" bgcolor="bbffbb"
| 11 || April 18 || Orioles || 6–4 || Beckett (2–1) || Eaton (0–2) || Papelbon (4) || 37,559 || 5–6
|- align="center" bgcolor="bbffbb"
| 12 || April 19 || Orioles || 2–1 || Lester (1–2) || Uehara (2–1) || Saito (1) || 37,869 || 6–6
|- align="center" bgcolor="bbffbb"
| 13 || April 20 || Orioles || 12–1 || Masterson (1–0) || Hendrickson (1–2) || || 37,865 || 7–6
|- align="center" bgcolor="bbbbbb"
| || April 21 || Twins || colspan=6 |Postponed
|- align="center" bgcolor="bbffbb"
| 14 || April 22 || Twins || 10 – 1 (8) || Wakefield (2–1) || Baker (0–2) || || || 8–6
|- align="center" bgcolor="bbffbb"
| 15 || April 22 || Twins || 7–3 || Penny (2–0) || Liriano (0–4) || || 37,494 || 9–6
|- align="center" bgcolor="bbffbb"
| 16 || April 24 || Yankees || 5 – 4 (11) || Ramírez (2–0) || Marte (0–1) || || 38,163 || 10–6
|- align="center" bgcolor="bbffbb"
| 17 || April 25 || Yankees || 16–11 || Okajima (1–0) || Albaladejo (1–1) || || 37,699 || 11–6
|- align="center" bgcolor="bbffbb"
| 18 || April 26 || Yankees || 4–1 || Masterson (2–0) || Pettitte (2–1) || Saito (2) || 38,154 || 12–6
|- align="center" bgcolor="bbffbb"
| 19 || April 27 || @ Indians || 3–1 || Delcarmen (1–0) || Wood (0–1) || Papelbon (5) || 18,652 || 13–6
|- align="center" bgcolor="ffbbbb"
| 20 || April 28 || @ Indians || 9–8 || Wood (1–1) || López (0–2) || || 19,613 || 13–7
|- align="center" bgcolor="bbffbb"
| 21 || April 29 || @ Indians || 6 – 5 (10) || Okajima (2–0) || Lewis (2–3) || Papelbon (6) || 19,137 || 14–7
|- align="center" bgcolor="ffbbbb"
| 22 || April 30 || @ Rays || 13–0 || Garza (2–2) || Beckett (2–2) || || 20,341 || 14–8
|-

|- bgcolor="ffbbbb"
|- align="center" bgcolor="ffbbbb"
| 23 || May 1 || @ Rays || 6–2 || Sonnanstine (1–3) || Masterson (2–1) || || 27,045 || 14–9
|- align="center" bgcolor="bbffbb"
| 24 || May 2 || @ Rays || 10–6 || Wakefield (3–1) || Niemann (2–3) || || 34,910 || 15–9
|- align="center" bgcolor="ffbbbb"
| 25 || May 3 || @ Rays || 5–3 || Shields (3–2) || Penny (2–1) || Percival (3) || 32,332 || 15–10
|- align="center" bgcolor="bbffbb"
| 26 || May 4 || @ Yankees || 6–4 || Lester (2–2) || Hughes (1–1) || Papelbon (7) || 46,426 || 16–10
|- align="center" bgcolor="bbffbb"
| 27 || May 5 || @ Yankees || 7–3 || Beckett (3–2) || Chamberlain (1–1) || || 46,810 || 17–10
|- align="center" bgcolor="ffbbbb"
| 28 || May 6 || Indians || 9–2 || Pavano (2–3) || Masterson (2–2) || Laffey (1) || 37,888 || 17–11
|- align="center" bgcolor="bbffbb"
| 29 || May 7 || Indians || 13–3 || Wakefield (4–1) || Sowers (0–1) || || 37,541 || 18–11
|- align="center" bgcolor="bbffbb"
| 30 || May 8 || Rays || 7–3 || Penny (3–1) || Shields (3–3) || || 37,745 || 19–11
|- align="center" bgcolor="ffbbbb"
| 31 || May 9 || Rays || 14–5 || Kazmir (4–3) || Lester (2–3) || Cormier (1) || 37,773 || 19–12
|- align="center" bgcolor="bbffbb"
| 32 || May 10 || Rays || 4–3 || Ramírez (3–0) || Shouse (1–1) || Papelbon (8) || 37,759 || 20–12
|- align="center" bgcolor="bbffbb"
| 33 || May 12 || @ Angels || 4–3 || Ramírez (4–0) || Shields (1–3) || Papelbon (9) || 33,411 || 21–12
|- align="center" bgcolor="ffbbbb"
| 34 || May 13 || @ Angels || 8–4 || Palmer (4–0) || Wakefield (4–2) || || 35,666 || 21–13
|- align="center" bgcolor="ffbbbb"
| 35 || May 14 || @ Angels || 5 – 4 (12) || Bulger (1–1) || Delcarmen (1–1) || || 35,124 || 21–14
|- align="center" bgcolor="ffbbbb"
| 36 || May 15 || @ Mariners || 5–4 || Jakubauskas (2–4) || Lester (2–4) || Aardsma (4) || 34,952 || 21–15
|- align="center" bgcolor="bbffbb"
| 37 || May 16 || @ Mariners || 5–3 || Beckett (4–2) || Olson (0–1) || Papelbon (10) || 42,589 || 22–15
|- align="center" bgcolor="ffbbbb"
| 38 || May 17 || @ Mariners || 3–2 || Aardsma (1–1) || Ramírez (4–1) || || 40,833 || 22–16
|- align="center" bgcolor="bbffbb"
| 39 || May 19 || Blue Jays || 2–1 || Wakefield (5–2) || Tallet (2–2) || Papelbon (11) || 37,830 || 23–16
|- align="center" bgcolor="bbffbb"
| 40 || May 20 || Blue Jays || 8–3 || Penny (4–1) || Cecil (2–1) || || 38,099 || 24–16
|- align="center" bgcolor="bbffbb"
| 41 || May 21 || Blue Jays || 5–1 || Lester (3–4) || Ray (1–2) || || 38,347 || 25–16
|- align="center" bgcolor="ffbbbb"
| 42 || May 22 || Mets || 5–3 || Santana (6–2) || Matsuzaka (0–2) || Rodríguez (12) || 38,092 || 25–17
|- align="center" bgcolor="ffbbbb"
| 43 || May 23 || Mets || 3–2 || Feliciano (1–1) || Papelbon (0–1) || Putz (2) || 37,871 || 25–18
|- align="center" bgcolor="bbffbb"
| 44 || May 24 || Mets || 12–5 || Wakefield (6–2) || Redding (0–1) || || 37,446 || 26–18
|- align="center" bgcolor="bbffbb"
| 45 || May 25 || @ Twins || 6–5 || Penny (5–1) || Liriano (2–6) || Papelbon (12) || 27,636 || 27–18
|- align="center" bgcolor="ffbbbb"
| 46 || May 26 || @ Twins || 5–2 || Blackburn (4–2) || Lester (3–5) || Nathan (7) || 20,019 || 27–19
|- align="center" bgcolor="ffbbbb"
| 47 || May 27 || @ Twins || 4–2 || Slowey (7–1) || Matsuzaka (0–3) || Nathan (8) || 28,221 || 27–20
|- align="center" bgcolor="bbffbb"
| 48 || May 28 || @ Twins || 3–1 || Beckett (5–2) || Swarzak (1–1) || Papelbon (13) || 23,958 || 28–20
|- align="center" bgcolor="ffbbbb"
| 49 || May 29 || @ Blue Jays || 6–3 || Janssen (1–1) || Wakefield (6–3) || Downs (6) || 32,026 || 28–21
|- align="center" bgcolor="ffbbbb"
| 50 || May 30 || @ Blue Jays || 5–3 || Tallet (3–3) || Ramírez (4–2) || Downs (7) || 35,484 || 28–22
|- align="center" bgcolor="bbffbb"
| 51 || May 31 || @ Blue Jays || 8–2 || Lester (4–5) || Romero (2–2) || || 30,496 || 29–22
|-

|- bgcolor="ffbbbb"
|- align="center" bgcolor="bbffbb"
| 52 || June 2 || @ Tigers || 5–1 || Matsuzaka (1–3) || Porcello (6–4) || || 25,914 || 30–22
|- align="center" bgcolor="bbffbb"
| 53 || June 3 || @ Tigers || 10–5 || Beckett (6–2) || Galarraga (3–6) || || 29,240 || 31–22
|- align="center" bgcolor="bbffbb"
| 54 || June 4 || @ Tigers || 6–3 || Wakefield (7–3) || Willis (1–3) || Papelbon (14) || 31,353 || 32–22
|- align="center" bgcolor="ffbbbb"
| 55 || June 5 || Rangers || 5–1 || Millwood (5–4) || Penny (5–2) || || 37,519 || 32–23
|- align="center" bgcolor="bbffbb"
| 56 || June 6 || Rangers || 8–1 || Lester (5–5) || Holland (1–3) || || 37,828 || 33–23
|- align="center" bgcolor="ffbbbb"
| 57 || June 7 || Rangers || 6–3 || Padilla (4–3) || Matsuzaka (1–4) || Wilson (5) || 37,537 || 33–24
|- align="center" bgcolor="bbffbb"
| 58 || June 9 || Yankees || 7–0 || Beckett (7–2) || Burnett (4–3) || || 37,883 || 34–24
|- align="center" bgcolor="bbffbb"
| 59 || June 10 || Yankees || 6–5 || Wakefield (8–3) || Wang (0–4) || Papelbon (15) || 38,121 || 35–24
|- align="center" bgcolor="bbffbb"
| 60 || June 11 || Yankees || 4–3 || Saito (1–0) || Sabathia (5–4) || Papelbon (16) || 38,153 || 36–24
|- align="center" bgcolor="bbffbb"
| 61 || June 12 || @ Phillies || 5 – 2 (13) || Saito (2–0) || Kendrick (0–1) || Bard (1) || 45,321 || 37–24
|- align="center" bgcolor="bbffbb"
| 62 || June 13 || @ Phillies || 11–6 || Okajima (3–0) || Bastardo (2–1) || || 45,202 || 38–24
|- align="center" bgcolor="ffbbbb"
| 63 || June 14 || @ Phillies || 11–6 || Park (3–1) || Beckett (7–3) || || 45,141 || 38–25
|- align="center" bgcolor="bbffbb"
| 64 || June 16 || Marlins || 8–2 || Wakefield (9–3) || Volstad (4–7) || || 38,149 || 39–25
|- align="center" bgcolor="bbffbb"
| 65 || June 17 || Marlins || 6–1 || Penny (6–2) || Miller (2–3) || || 38,196 || 40–25
|- align="center" bgcolor="ffbbbb"
| 66 || June 18 || Marlins || 2 – 1 (6) || Nolasco (3–6) || Lester (5–6) || || 37,577 || 40–26
|- align="center" bgcolor="ffbbbb"
| 67 || June 19 || Braves || 8–2 || Kawakami (4–6) || Matsuzaka (1–5)|| || 37,703|| 40–27
|- align="center" bgcolor="bbffbb"
| 68 || June 20 || Braves || 3–0 || Beckett (8–3) || Lowe (7–5) || || 38,029 || 41–27
|- align="center" bgcolor="bbffbb"
| 69 || June 21 || Braves || 6–5 || Papelbon (1–1) || Bennett (2–4)|| || 37,243 || 42–27
|- align="center" bgcolor="bbffbb"
| 70 || June 23 || @ Nationals || 11–3 || Delcarmen (2–1) || Tavárez (3–5) || || 41,517 || 43–27
|- align="center" bgcolor="bbffbb"
| 71 || June 24 || @ Nationals || 6–4 || Lester (6–6) || Stammen (1–3) || Papelbon (17) || 41,530 || 44–27
|- align="center" bgcolor="ffbbbb"
| 72 || June 25 || @ Nationals || 9–3 || Zimmermann (3–3) || Smoltz (0–1) || || 41,985 || 44–28
|- align="center" bgcolor="bbffbb"
| 73 || June 26 || @ Braves || 4–1 || Beckett (9–3) || Jurrjens (5–6) || || 48,418 || 45–28
|- align="center" bgcolor="bbffbb"
| 74 || June 27 || @ Braves || 1–0 || Wakefield (10–3) || Vázquez (5–7) || Papelbon (18) || 48,151 || 46–28
|- align="center" bgcolor="ffbbbb"
| 75 || June 28 || @ Braves || 2–1 || Hanson (4–0) || Penny (6–3) || González (9) || 41,463 || 46–29
|- align="center" bgcolor="bbffbb"
| 76 || June 29 || @ Orioles || 4–0 || Lester (7–6) || Berken (1–5) || Papelbon (19) || 36,548 || 47–29
|- align="center" bgcolor="ffbbbb"
| 77 || June 30 || @ Orioles || 11–10 || Hendrickson (3–4) || Saito (2–1) || Sherrill (17) || 31,969 || 47–30
|-

|- bgcolor="ffbbbb"
|- align="center" bgcolor="bbffbb"
| 78 || July 1 || @ Orioles || 6 – 5 (11) || Ramírez (5–2) || Báez (4–2) || Papelbon (20) || 29,391 || 48–30
|- align="center" bgcolor="ffbbbb"
| 79 || July 3 || Mariners || 7 – 6 (11) || Jakubauskas (5–5) || Ramírez (5–3) || Lowe (1) || 38,078 || 48–31
|- align="center" bgcolor="ffbbbb"
| 80 || July 4 || Mariners || 3–2 || Corcoran (2–0) || Saito (2–2) || Aardsma (17) || 37,656 || 48–32
|- align="center" bgcolor="bbffbb"
| 81 || July 5 || Mariners || 8–4 || Masterson (3–2) || Batista (5–3) || || 37,691 || 49–32
|- align="center" bgcolor="ffbbbb"
| 82 || July 6 || Athletics || 6–0 || Anderson (5–7) || Smoltz (0–2) || || 38,294 || 49–33
|- align="center" bgcolor="bbffbb"
| 83 || July 7 || Athletics || 5–2 || Beckett (10–3) || Eveland (1–3) || Papelbon (21) || 37,676 || 50–33
|- align="center" bgcolor="bbffbb"
| 84 || July 8 || Athletics || 5–4 || Wakefield (11–3) || Cahill (5–8) || Papelbon (22) || 37,981 || 51–33
|- align="center" bgcolor="ffbbbb"
| 85 || July 9 || Royals || 8–6 || Hochevar (5–3) || Masterson (3–3) || Soria (14) || 38,189 || 51–34
|- align="center" bgcolor="bbffbb"
| 86 || July 10 || Royals || 1–0 || Lester (8–6) || Bannister (6–7) || Papelbon (23) || 38,116 || 52–34
|- align="center" bgcolor="bbffbb"
| 87 || July 11 || Royals || 15–9 || Smoltz (1–2) || Meche (4–9) || || 37,825 || 53–34
|- align="center" bgcolor="bbffbb"
| 88 || July 12 || Royals || 6–0 || Beckett (11–3) || Chen (0–4) || || 37,612 || 54–34
|- bgcolor="bbbbff"
|align="center" colspan="9"|All-Star Break: AL def. NL at Busch Stadium, 4–3
|- align="center" bgcolor="bbffbb"
| 89 || July 17 || @ Blue Jays || 4–1 || Buchholz (1–0) || Romero (7–4) || Papelbon (24) || 32,928 || 55–34
|- align="center" bgcolor="ffbbbb"
| 90 || July 18 || @ Blue Jays || 6–2 || Rzepczynski (1–1) || Penny (6–4) || || 36,926 || 55–35
|- align="center" bgcolor="ffbbbb"
| 91 || July 19 || @ Blue Jays || 3–1 || Halladay (11–3) || Lester (8–7) || || 36,534 || 55–36
|- align="center" bgcolor="ffbbbb"
| 92 || July 20 || @ Rangers || 6–3 || Millwood (9–7) || Smoltz (1–3) || Wilson (8) || 28,916 || 55–37
|- align="center" bgcolor="ffbbbb"
| 93 || July 21 || @ Rangers || 4–2 || Hunter (9–7) || Beckett (11–4) || Wilson (9) || 28,555 || 55–38
|- align="center" bgcolor="ffbbbb"
| 94 || July 22 || @ Rangers || 3–1 || Nippert (2–0) || Buchholz (1–1) || Mathis (1) || 39,778 || 55–39
|- align="center" bgcolor="bbffbb"
| 95 || July 24 || Orioles || 3–1 || Penny (7–4) || Bergesen (6–5) || Papelbon (25) || 38,058 || 56–39
|- align="center" bgcolor="bbffbb"
| 96 || July 25 || Orioles || 7–2 || Lester (9–7) || Guthrie (7–9) || || 38,063 || 57–39
|- align="center" bgcolor="ffbbbb"
| 97 || July 26 || Orioles || 6–2 || Hernandez (3–2) || Smoltz (1–4) || || 37,606 || 57–40
|- align="center" bgcolor="bbffbb"
| 98 || July 27 || Athletics || 8–2 || Beckett (12–4) || Cahill (6–9) || || 37,955 || 58–40
|- align="center" bgcolor="ffbbbb"
| 99 || July 28 || Athletics || 9 – 8 (11) || Berslow (4–4) || Delcarmen (2–2) || Bailey (12) || 38,084 || 58–41
|- align="center" bgcolor="ffbbbb"
| 100 || July 29 || Athletics || 8–6 || Anderson (6–8) || Penny (7–5) || Bailey (13) || 38,193 || 58–42
|- align="center" bgcolor="bbffbb"
| 101 || July 30 || Athletics || 8–5 || Delcarmen (3–2) || Breslow (4–5) || Papelbon (26) || 37,919 || 59–42
|- align="center" bgcolor="bbffbb"
| 102 || July 31 || @ Orioles || 6–5 || Smoltz (2–4) || Guthrie (7–10) || Papelbon (27) || 44,091 || 60–42
|-

|- bgcolor="ffbbbb"
|- align="center" bgcolor="bbffbb"
| 103 || August 1 || @ Orioles || 4–0 || Beckett (13–4) || Hernandez (3–3) || || 49,384 || 61–42
|- align="center" bgcolor="bbffbb"
| 104 || August 2 || @ Orioles || 18–10 || Delcarmen (4–2) || Berken (1–9) || || 43,115 || 62–42
|- align="center" bgcolor="ffbbbb"
| 105 || August 4 || @ Rays || 4 – 2 (13) || Cormier (2–1) || Saito (2–3) || || 29,873 || 62–43
|- align="center" bgcolor="ffbbbb"
| 106 || August 5 || @ Rays || 6–4 || Price (5–4) || Penny (7–6) || Howell (12) || 31,517 || 62–44
|- align="center" bgcolor="ffbbbb"
| 107 || August 6 || @ Yankees || 13–6 || Chamberlain (8–2) || Smoltz (2–5) || || 49,005 ||62–45
|- align="center" bgcolor="ffbbbb"
| 108 || August 7 || @ Yankees || 2 – 0 (15) || Coke (3–3) || Tazawa (0–1) || || 48,262 || 62–46
|- align="center" bgcolor="ffbbbb"
| 109 || August 8 || @ Yankees || 5–0 || Sabathia (12–7) || Buchholz (1–2) || || 48,796 || 62–47
|- align="center" bgcolor="ffbbbb"
| 110 || August 9 || @ Yankees || 5–2 || Coke (4–3) || Bard (0–1) || Rivera (32) || 48,190 || 62–48
|- align="center" bgcolor="bbffbb"
| 111 || August 10 || Tigers || 6–5 || Ramírez (6–3) || Miner (5–2) || Papelbon (28) || 37,960 || 63–48
|- align="center" bgcolor="bbffbb"
| 112 || August 11 || Tigers || 7–5 || Tazawa (1–1) || Lambert (0–1) || || 38,013 || 64–48
|- align="center" bgcolor="bbffbb"
| 113 || August 12 || Tigers || 8–2 || Beckett (14–4) || Miner (5–3) || || 38,124 || 65–48
|- align="center" bgcolor="ffbbbb"
| 114 || August 13 || Tigers || 2–0 || Verlander (13–6) || Buchholz (1–3) || Rodney (24) || 37,556 || 65–49
|- align="center" bgcolor="bbffbb"
| 115 || August 14 || @ Rangers || 8–4 || Saito (3–3) || Francisco (2–2) || || 40,311 || 66–49
|- align="center" bgcolor="ffbbbb"
| 116 || August 15 || @ Rangers || 7–2 || Holland (6–7) || Penny (7–7) || Feliz (1) || 48,201 || 66–50
|- align="center" bgcolor="ffbbbb"
| 117 || August 16 || @ Rangers || 4–3 || Nippert (4–1) || Tazawa (1–2) || Francisco (17) || 27,155 || 66–51
|- align="center" bgcolor="bbffbb"
| 118 || August 18 || @ Blue Jays || 10–9 || Okajima (4–0) || Janssen (2–4) || Papelbon (29) || 25,472 || 67–51
|- align="center" bgcolor="bbffbb"
| 119 || August 19 || @ Blue Jays || 6–1 || Buchholz (2–3) || Halladay (13–6) || || 25,925 || 68–51
|- align="center" bgcolor="bbffbb"
| 120 || August 20 || @ Blue Jays || 8–1 || Lester (10–7) || Cecil (5–2) || || 22,817 || 69–51
|- align="center" bgcolor="ffbbbb"
| 121 || August 21 || Yankees || 20–11 || Pettitte (10–6) || Penny (7–8) || || 37,869 || 69–52
|- align="center" bgcolor="bbffbb"
| 122 || August 22 || Yankees || 14–1 || Tazawa (2–2) || Burnett (10–7) || || 37,277 || 70–52
|- align="center" bgcolor="ffbbbb"
| 123 || August 23 || Yankees || 8–4 || Sabathia (15–7) || Beckett (14–5) || || 38,008 || 70–53
|- align="center" bgcolor="bbffbb"
| 124 || August 24 || White Sox || 12–8 || Ramírez (6–3) || Contreras (5–7) || || 37,812 || 71–53
|- align="center" bgcolor="bbffbb"
| 125 || August 25 || White Sox || 6–3 || Delcarmen (5–2) ||Linebrink (3–6) || Papelbon (30) || 38,059 || 72–53
|- align="center" bgcolor="bbffbb"
| 126 || August 26 || White Sox || 3–2 || Bard (1–1) || Peña (6–5) || || 37,839 || 73–53
|- align="center" bgcolor="ffbbbb"
| 127 || August 27 || White Sox || 9–5 || Danks (12–8) || Tazawa (2–3) || || 38,003 || 73–54
|- align="center" bgcolor="bbffbb"
| 128 || August 28 || Blue Jays || 6–5 || Okajima (5–0) || Tallet (5–8) || Papelbon (31) || 37,844 || 74–54
|- align="center" bgcolor="bbffbb"
| 129 || August 29 || Blue Jays || 3–2 || Buchholz (3–3) || Romero (11–6) || Papelbon (32) || 37,452 || 75–54
|- align="center" bgcolor="bbffbb"
| 130 || August 30 || Blue Jays || 7–0 || Byrd (1–0) || Halladay (13–8) || || 37,560 || 76–54
|-

|- bgcolor="ffbbbb"
|- align="center" bgcolor="bbffbb"
| 131 || September 1 || @ Rays || 8–4 || Lester (11–7) || Sonnanstine (6–8) || Papelbon (33) || 17,692 || 77–54
|- align="center" bgcolor="ffbbbb"
| 132 || September 2 || @ Rays || 8–5 || Howell (7–4) || Ramírez (7–4) || Wheeler (2) || 19,148 || 77–55
|- align="center" bgcolor="bbffbb"
| 133 || September 3 || @ Rays || 6–3 || Buchholz (4–3) || Price (7–7) || Papelbon (34) || 20,823 || 78–55
|- align="center" bgcolor="ffbbbb"
| 134 || September 4 || @ White Sox || 12–2 || García (1–2) || Byrd (1–1) || || 28,839 || 78–56
|- align="center" bgcolor="ffbbbb"
| 135 || September 5 || @ White Sox || 5–1 || Floyd (11–9) || Wakefield (11–4) || || 33,239 || 76–57
|- align="center" bgcolor="bbffbb"
| 136 || September 6 || @ White Sox || 6–1 || Lester (12–7) || Danks (12–9) || || 32,134 || 79–57
|- align="center" bgcolor="ffbbbb"
| 137 || September 7 || @ White Sox || 5–1 || Buehrle (12–7) || Beckett (14–6) || || 22,511 || 79–58
|- align="center" bgcolor="bbffbb"
| 138 || September 8 || Orioles || 10–0 || Buchholz (5–3) || Hernandez (4–7) || || 37,647 || 80–58
|- align="center" bgcolor="bbffbb"
| 139 || September 9 || Orioles || 7–5 || Wagner (1–0) || Albers (2–5) || Papelbon (35) || 37,712 || 81–58
|- align="center" bgcolor="bbbbbb"
| || September 11 || Rays || colspan=6 |Postponed
|- align="center" bgcolor="bbffbb"
| 140 || September 12 || Rays || 9 – 1 (6) || Beckett (15–6) || Davis (0–1) || || 37,755 || 82–58
|- align="center" bgcolor="bbffbb"
| 141 || September 13 || Rays || 3–1 || Okajima (6–0) || Garza (7–10) || Papelbon (36) || 38,228 || 83–58
|- align="center" bgcolor="bbffbb"
| 142 || September 13 || Rays || 4–0 || Lester (13–7) || Shields (9–11) || || 37,271 || 84–58
|- align="center" bgcolor="bbffbb"
| 143 || September 15 || Angels || 4–1 || Matsuzaka (2–5) || Lackey (10–8) || || 37,942 || 85–58
|- align="center" bgcolor="bbffbb"
| 144 || September 16 || Angels || 9–8 || Bard (2–1) || Fuentes (1–5) || || 37,706 || 86–58
|- align="center" bgcolor="ffbbbb"
| 145 || September 17 || Angels || 4–3 || Jepsen (6–3) || Wagner (1–1) || Fuentes (42) || 38,157 || 86–59
|- align="center" bgcolor="bbffbb"
| 146 || September 18 || @ Orioles || 3–1 || Buchholz (6–3) || Guthrie (10–15) || Papelbon (37) || 26,812 || 87–59
|- align="center" bgcolor="bbffbb"
| 147 || September 19 || @ Orioles || 11–5 || Lester (14–7) || Albers (2–6) || || 39,285 || 88–59
|- align="center" bgcolor="bbffbb"
| 148 || September 20 || @ Orioles || 9–3 || Matsuzaka (3–5) || Berken (5–12) || || 27,546 || 89–59
|- align="center" bgcolor="ffbbbb"
| 149 || September 21 || @ Royals || 12–9 || Yabuta (2–1) || Bard (2–2) || Soria (27) || 16,770 || 89–60
|- align="center" bgcolor="ffbbbb"
| 150 || September 22 || @ Royals || 5–1 || Greinke (15–8) || Byrd (1–2) || Soria (28) || 21,228 || 89–61
|- align="center" bgcolor="bbffbb"
| 151 || September 23 || @ Royals || 9–2 || Beckett (16–6) || Hochevar (7–11) || || 18,989 || 90–61
|- align="center" bgcolor="bbffbb"
| 152 || September 24 || @ Royals || 10–3 || Buchholz (7–3) || Lerew (0–1) || || 20,807 || 91–61
|- align="center" bgcolor="ffbbbb"
| 153 || September 25 || @ Yankees || 9–5 || Chamberlain (9–6) || Lester (14–8) || || 48,449 || 91–62
|- align="center" bgcolor="ffbbbb"
| 154 || September 26 || @ Yankees || 3–0 || Sabathia (19–7) || Matsuzaka (3–6) || Rivera (43) || 48,809 || 91–63
|- align="center" bgcolor="ffbbbb"
| 155 || September 27 || @ Yankees || 4–2 || Pettitte (14–7) || Byrd (1–3) || Rivera (44) || 47,576 || 91–64
|- align="center" bgcolor="ffbbbb"
| 156 || September 28 || Blue Jays || 11 – 5 (7) || Richmond (8–10) || Bowden (0–1) || || 37,591 || 91–65
|- align="center" bgcolor="ffbbbb"
| 157 || September 29 || Blue Jays || 8–7 || Romero (13–9) || Buchholz (7–4) || Frasor (11) || 37,618 || 91–66
|- align="center" bgcolor="ffbbbb"
| 158 || September 30 || Blue Jays || 12–0 || Halladay (17–10) || Wakefield (11–5) || || 37,246 || 91–67
|-

|- bgcolor="ffbbbb"
|- align="center" bgcolor="bbffbb"
| 159 || October 1 || Indians || 3–0 || Lester (15–8) || Carrasco (0–4) || Papelbon (38) || 37,459 || 92–67
|- align="center" bgcolor="bbffbb"
| 160 || October 2 || Indians || 6–2 || Matsuzaka (4–6) || Sowers (6–11) || || 37,787 || 93–67
|- align="center" bgcolor="bbffbb"
| 161 || October 3 || Indians || 11–6 || Beckett (17–6) || Laffey (7–9) || || 37,562 || 94–67
|- align="center" bgcolor="bbffbb"
| 162 || October 4 || Indians || 12–7 || Bowden (1–1) || Ohka (1–5) || || 37,247 || 95–67
|-

|- align="center" bgcolor="ffbbbb"
| 1 || October 8 || @ Angels || 5–0 || Lackey (1–0) || Lester (0–1) || || Angel Stadium of Anaheim || 45,070 || 0–1 || 
|- align="center" bgcolor="ffbbbb"
| 2 || October 9 || @ Angels || 4–1 || Weaver (1–0) || Beckett (0–1) || Fuentes (1) || Angel Stadium of Anaheim || 45,223 || 0–2 || 
|- align="center" bgcolor="ffbbbb"
| 3 || October 11 || Angels || 7–6 || Oliver (1–0) || Papelbon (0–1) || Fuentes (2) || Fenway Park || 38,704 || 0–3 || 
|-

Player stats

Batting 
Note: G = Games played; AB = At bats; R = Runs scored; H = Hits; 2B = Doubles; 3B = Triples; HR = Home runs; RBI = Runs batted in; AVG = Batting average; SB = Stolen bases

 Source: Boston Red Sox batting stats

Pitching 
Note: W = Wins; L = Losses; ERA = Earned run average; G = Games pitched; GS = Games started; SV = Saves; IP = Innings pitched; R = Runs allowed; ER = Earned runs allowed; HR = Home Run Allowed; BB = Walks allowed; K = Strikeouts

 Source: Boston Red Sox pitching stats

Awards and honors 
Awards
 Jason Bay – Silver Slugger Award (OF)
 Josh Beckett – AL Player of the Week (July 6–12)
 Mike Lowell – AL Player of the Week (April 20–26)

All-Star Game

Recognition
 On December 22, 2009, Sports Illustrated named general manager Theo Epstein as No. 3 on its list of the Top 10 GMs/Executives of the Decade. The list's only other MLB general managers were Seattle and Philadelphia's Pat Gillick (at No. 7) and Oakland's Billy Beane (at No. 10).

Farm system 

The Class A-Advanced affiliate changed from the Lancaster JetHawks to the Salem Red Sox.

Source:

References

External links 
 2009 Boston Red Sox season at Baseball Reference
 2009 Boston Red Sox official site
 2009 Boston Red Sox Draft Selections

Boston Red Sox seasons
Boston Red Sox
Boston Red Sox
Red Sox